"Edamame" (stylized in all lowercase) is a song by Canadian rapper bbno$ featuring Indonesian rapper Rich Brian. It was released as a single on July 23, 2021, from bbno$'s sixth studio album Eat Ya Veggies. bbno$ and Rich Brian wrote the song with Christian Dold, and it was produced by Diamond Pistols. It also went viral on TikTok, being used in over 10 million videos and watched over two billion times.

The song was a Juno Award nominee for Rap Single of the Year at the Juno Awards of 2022.

Background
On July 14, 2021, bbno$ posted on Twitter that he and Rich Brian had made a song. In an interview with Cool Accidents, bbno$ stated: "I started the song with Diamond Pistols, then I just sent it to him and texted Rich Brian. He immediately replied and was like "THIS SONG IS FIRE". He then jumped on it and sent a verse over, came to the studio and we finished it together".

Critical reception
Brodie Harvey of Lyrical Lemonade praised the two artists, writing that "the chemistry is top-notch in the way they effortlessly trade verses back and forth", which "keeps the energy at a high level from beginning to end". Anthony Fantano cited the song as one of his favorite singles of 2021, describing it as "one of the biggest bops of the year".

Music video
An accompanying video was released on July 23, 2021. It features the two artists "clad in medieval armour from the middle ages, puttering around in a lavish Los Angeles home".

Usage in media
The song was featured in the films Moonshot and The Man from Toronto, the shows Tom Swift, Superman & Lois, Pretty Little Liars: Original Sin, and the trailer for the 2022 film The Bubble.

Credits and personnel
Credits adapted from Tidal.

 Diamond Pistols – producer
 Alex Gumuchian – composer, lyricist
 Brian Imanuel – composer, lyricist
 Christian Dold – composer, lyricist
 Rich Brian – featured artist

Charts

Weekly charts

Year-end charts

Certifications

References

2021 songs
2021 singles
Bbno$ songs
Rich Brian songs
Songs written by Bbno$
Songs written by Rich Brian